The Directorate of Health (Icelandic: Embætti landlæknis) is an Icelandic government agency which principal role is to promote high-quality and safe health care for the people of Iceland, health promotion, and effective disease prevention measures.

History
The Directorate was founded on 18 March 1760 when Bjarni Pálsson was made the first Director of Health (Icelandic: Landlæknir) by a royal decree. In 2018, Alma Möller became the first woman to serves as Director.

Directors of Health 
 Bjarni Pálsson 1760–1779
 Jón Sveinsson 1780–1803
 Sveinn Pálsson 1803–1804 (acting)
 Tómas Klog 1804–1815
 Oddur Hjaltalín 1816–1820 (acting)
 Jón Thorstenssen 1820–1855
 Jón Hjaltalín 1855–1881
 Jónas Jónassen 1881–1882 (acting)
 Hans J. G. Schierbeck 1882–1895
 Jónas Jónassen 1895–1906
 Guðmundur Björnsson 1906–1931
 Vilmundur Jónsson 1931–1959
 Sigurður Sigurðsson 1960–1972
 Ólafur Ólafsson 1972–1998
 Sigurður Guðmundsson 1998–2006
 Matthías Halldórsson 2006–2007 (acting)
 Sigurður Guðmundsson 2007–2008
 Matthías Halldórsson 2008–2009
 Geir Gunnlaugsson 2010–2014
 Birgir Jakobsson 2015–2018
 Alma Möller 2018–present

References

External links
Official website

1760 establishments in Europe
Government agencies of Iceland
Healthcare in Iceland
Iceland
National public health agencies